The 2021 French motorcycle Grand Prix (officially known as the Shark Grand Prix de France) was the fifth round of the 2021 Grand Prix motorcycle racing season and the second round of the 2021 MotoE World Cup. It was held at the Bugatti Circuit in Le Mans on 16 May 2021.

Qualifying

MotoGP

Race

MotoGP

Moto2
Yari Montella was replaced by Alonso López after the Friday practice sessions due to injury.

Moto3

 Yuki Kunii suffered a broken collarbone in a crash during qualifying and withdrew from the event.

MotoE

All bikes manufactured by Energica.

Championship standings after the race
Below are the standings for the top five riders, constructors, and teams after the round.

MotoGP

Riders' Championship standings

Constructors' Championship standings

Teams' Championship standings

Moto2

Riders' Championship standings

Constructors' Championship standings

Teams' Championship standings

Moto3

Riders' Championship standings

Constructors' Championship standings

Teams' Championship standings

MotoE

Notes

References

External links

French
Motorcycle Grand Prix
Motorcycle Grand Prix
French motorcycle Grand Prix